Kirsty Dillon  (born 1976) is an English actress who works in film, television and theatre. She is perhaps best known for her role as WPC Gail Stephens in the British television drama Midsomer Murders.

Early life and education
Dillon was born and brought up in Portsmouth, Hampshire. She was educated at Portsmouth High School and Havant College and studied Drama and Theatre Arts at Goldsmiths', University of London and Webber Douglas Academy of Dramatic Art.

Career
Her roles include the BBC drama ‘The Man That Broke Britain’, Spellbound for Peter Greenaway, Rosalind in ‘As You Like It’ as well as numerous TV credits including Holby City, Casualty, The Bill, Doctors, and the Channel 4 film ‘Rockabye’. She is probably best recognised for her regular role as DC Gail Stephens in the drama 'Midsomer Murders'.

Dillon is an ambassador of the White Ribbon Campaign, the international campaign to ‘End Male Violence Against Women’. She works closely with survivors of domestic violence through organisations such as Early Intervention Project and Women's Aid and campaigns to raise awareness which includes handing in petition at 10 Downing Street and gaining support from John Nettles and David James to raise awareness amongst men.

In 2016, Dillon played the role of Luke's mother, Helen, in the movie "To Dream".

Filmography
 Clock Tower 3 - Alyssa Hamilton
 Locke (2014)
  To Dream (2016) - Helen
 Justine'' (2020)

References

External links

 
 

1976 births
Living people
Alumni of Goldsmiths, University of London
English film actresses
English stage actresses
English television actresses
People educated at Portsmouth High School (Southsea)
Actresses from Portsmouth